Guagno is a commune in the Corse-du-Sud department in France on the island of Corsica.

The Guagno River, also called the Fiume Grosso, flows through the commune from east to west.
It is a tributary of the Liamone River.

Population

See also
Communes of the Corse-du-Sud department

References

Communes of Corse-du-Sud
Corse-du-Sud communes articles needing translation from French Wikipedia